The following is a list of Grammy Awards winners and nominees from Spain:

Notes

References

Spanish

 Grammy
Grammy
Grammy